Clayton Edward Crafts (July 8, 1848 – August 26, 1920) was an American lawyer and politician.

Biography
Born in Auburn Township, Geauga County, Ohio, Crafts went to Hiram College and the Union College of Law, Cleveland, Ohio. He practiced law in Cleveland, Ohio and Watkins Glen, New York and then in 1869, moved to Chicago, Illinois where he continue to practice law. Crafts was involved with the Democratic Party. From 1887 to 1897 and from 1901 to 1904, Crafts served in the Illinois House of Representatives and was the speaker of the house.

He died at his home in Chicago on August 26, 1920.

References

1848 births
1920 deaths
People from Geauga County, Ohio
Politicians from Chicago
Hiram College alumni
Illinois lawyers
Ohio lawyers
New York (state) lawyers
Speakers of the Illinois House of Representatives
Democratic Party members of the Illinois House of Representatives
19th-century American lawyers